Platyhypnidium alopecuroides, or Portuguese feather-moss, is a species of moss from the family Brachytheciaceae, first described in 2000. It is an aquatic moss and is normally found growing in rocky streams.

Description
Platyhypnidium alopecuroides is a green to brownish aquatic moss. The stems grow to approximately 10 cm in length and have few branches. The leaves are 2-3mm in length, concave and grow overlapping each other, giving it a cylindrical look.

Habitat
It grows on rocks in fast flowing streams and can be found in both open and wooded areas.

References

Hypnales
Taxobox binomials not recognized by IUCN